Spinovelleda is a genus of longhorn beetles of the subfamily Lamiinae, containing the following species:

 Spinovelleda basilewskyi Breuning, 1960
 Spinovelleda excavata Breuning, 1942

References

Phrissomini